The Rape of Arundel (also known as Arundel Rape) is one of the rapes, the traditional sub-divisions unique to the historic county of Sussex in England.

The population of the rape of Arundel was 22,478 in 1801, falling to 24,276 in 1811.

Location
The rape of Chichester lies to its west and the rape of Bramber lies to its east. To the north the rape is bounded by the county of Surrey and to the south by the English Channel. The rape of Arundel includes the towns of Arundel and Littlehampton.

Historical population

Sub-divisions
The rape is traditionally divided into the following hundreds:
 Avisford (named Binsted in 1086 but had its later name by 1166)
 Bury
 Poling
 Rotherbridge
 West Easwrith

See also
 History of Sussex
 List of hundreds of England and Wales

References

External links
 Arundel Rape through time  - A Vision of Britain

History of Sussex